This is a list of roads designated N34. Roads entries are sorted in the countries alphabetical order.

 N34 road (Belgium), a road connecting Knokke and with De Panne
 N34 road (France), a road connecting Vincennes, Coulommiers and Esternay
 N34 road (Luxembourg) 
 N34 road (Negeri Sembilan), a road connecting Semenyih and Mantin in Malaysia
 Provincial road N34 (Netherlands), a road connecting De Punt to Ommen in the Netherlands

See also
 List of highways numbered 34